"I Want You Around" (stylized as "-I want you around") is a song by Swedish-Iranian singer and songwriter Snoh Aalegra, released as the second single from her second studio album Ugh, Those Feels Again  (2019). The song was written by Aalegra and Marcus James and it was produced by Cam O'bi and Rob Holladay. It was released on 18 February 2019. On November 1, 2019, a remix of "I Want You Around" featuring American singer and rapper 6lack was released to mixed reviews from critics.

"I Want You Around" reached number 1 on the Billboard Adult R&B Songs chart.

Music video
The music video for "I Want You Around" was directed by Alexander Black and aided by I.P.W. The music video shows Aalegra with rapper, A$AP Twelvyy spending time in a romantic day together  and wrapped up in each other's arms and sharing moments at home and on the road.

Certifications

References

External links
 

2019 singles
2019 songs
Snoh Aalegra songs
2010s ballads
Contemporary R&B ballads